The National Lacrosse League Rookie of the Year Award is given annually to the top rookie in the National Lacrosse League. The award winners are chosen by a vote of the leagues coaches, general managers, and executives.

In 2006, the award was sponsored by S.C. Johnson and was known as the "Edge Active Care Rookie of the Year Award".

Past winners

Footnotes

Rookie